Žakanje is a municipality in Karlovac County, Croatia. There are 1,889 inhabitants, in the following settlements:
 Breznik Žakanjski, population 13
 Brihovo, population 149
 Bubnjarački Brod, population 122
 Bubnjarci, population 210
 Donji Bukovac Žakanjski, population 115
 Ertić, population 16
 Gornji Bukovac Žakanjski, population 14
 Jadrići, population 7
 Jugovac, population 14
 Jurovo, population 84
 Jurovski Brod, population 182
 Kohanjac, population 96
 Mala Paka, population 26
 Mišinci, population 147
 Mošanci, population 35
 Pravutina, population 211
 Sela Žakanjska, population 68
 Sračak, population 38
 Stankovci, population 17
 Velika Paka, population 44
 Zaluka Lipnička, population 132
 Žakanje, population 149

97.5% of the population are Croats (2011 census).

Zakanje is surrounded by rolling hills, farms, orchards and vineyards. Over the last 50 years the community has expanded significantly. The town center contains a school, several restaurants, a grocery store, bank, post-office, pharmacy and a walk-in medical clinic. There are also a number of small general stores and other small businesses.

The Roman Catholic Church sits on the highest point of the village about 1 kilometer from the center. The church was built in 1896, and contains many paintings.  The main road connects to Karlovac, and Metlika, Slovenia.

The oldest local surnames are Bahoric and Zdencaj.

Juraj Križanić, a Croatian missionary, was born near Žakanje.

References

Municipalities of Croatia
Populated places in Karlovac County